Techiman Eleven Wonders FC are a Ghanaian football club from Techiman currently playing in the Ghana Premier League. They play televised home games in the Obuasi Len Clay Sports Stadium in Obuasi.

History 
They were promoted to the top flight of Ghanaian soccer for the first time in 2017 after finishing in first place in Zone 1 of the Division One League. They immediately set about fundraising in an attempt to avoid relegation.

Their first official Premier League signing was veteran defender Idrissu Yahaya. In their first top-flight match, they held 20-time champion Hearts of Oak to a surprising 1–1 draw, with Alex Asamoah scoring their maiden goal. During the 2020–21 Ghana Premier League season, one of their stand out performers Salifu Ibrahim was signed by Accra Hearts of Oak.

Grounds 
The club plays their home matches at Ohene Ameyaw Park in Techiman in the Bono East Region, but they relocated to the Obuasi Len Clay Sports Stadium for the 2020–21 Ghana Premier League season.

Current squad 

As of December 2020

Coaches 
Ignatius Osei-Fosu ( 2019–2021)

See also 

 Techiman
 Alex Asamoah
 2020–21 Ghana Premier League

References

External links 

 Official Twitter profile
 Official Facebook page

 Techiman Eleven Wonders FC at Global Sports Archive

Football clubs in Ghana
Sports clubs in Ghana
Bono East Region